Plainsburg Union Elementary School District  is a public school district based in Merced County, California, United States.

References

External links
 

School districts in Merced County, California